The E22000 is an electric multiple unit built by CAF for use on the İZBAN commuter rail system. 33 sets of 3 train cars were built between 2010–11 and have been operating along the Northern and Southern lines in Izmir since 2010. The 22000 series EMUs are powered by 25 kV AC via overhead catenary. Each 3 car set cost €3.7 million each.

References

Turkish railways electric multiple units
İZBAN
Train-related introductions in 2010

CAF multiple units
25 kV AC multiple units